Darreh Gahlui-ye Barzand (also Romanized as Darreh Gāhlūī-ye Barzand; also known as Darreh Gāhlū) is a village in Pain Barzand Rural District, Anguti District, Germi County, Ardabil Province, Iran. At the 2006 census, its population was 48, in 9 families.

References 

Towns and villages in Germi County